This article lists the colonial governors of Samoa (or Western Samoa), from the establishment of German Samoa in 1900 until the independence of the Western Samoa Trust Territory in 1962.

List 

(Dates in italics indicate de facto continuation of office)

On 1 January 1962, Western Samoa achieved independence following the passage of the 1961 referendum. For a list of heads of state after independence, see O le Ao o le Malo.

See also 
 Samoa
 Politics of Samoa
 O le Ao o le Malo
 Prime Minister of Samoa
 Lists of office-holders
 New Zealand–Samoa relations

References

External links 
 Rulers.org: Samoa
 World Statesmen.org: Samoa

Colonial governors
German Samoa
List
Colonial governors
Samoa
Foreign relations of Samoa
Colonial governors
Colonial governors
Colonial governors
Colonial governors
20th century in Samoa